Cachimayo District is one of nine districts of the province Anta in Peru. 

The district is named after the Kachimayu (Quechua for "salt river") which crosses the district from west to east.

Ethnic groups 
The people in the district are mainly indigenous citizens of Quechua descent. Quechua is the language which the majority of the population (50.34%) learnt to speak in childhood, 49.41% of the residents started speaking using the Spanish language (2007 Peru Census).

See also 
 Sinqa

References

1970 establishments in Peru
States and territories established in 1970